The Gözne Boundary Stone is an Aramaic inscription found in situ in 1907 near the village of Gözne in Southern Anatolia, by John Renwick Metheny. It was first published by James Alan Montgomery.

Bibliography
 Metheny, J.R., "Road Notes from Cilicia and North Syria." JAOS 28 (1907): 155–63
 Montgomery, James A., "Report on an Aramaic Boundary Inscription in Cilicia." JAOS 28 (1907): 164–67 + 1 pl.
 Halévy, J., "Une inscription bornaire araméenne de Cilicie." RevSém 16 (1908b): 434–37
 Hanson, R.S., "Aramaic Funerary and Boundary Inscriptions from Asia Minor." BASOR 192 (1968): 3–11. Kesecek Daskyleion LimBil GozBdSt

References

Aramaic inscriptions